The 9/11 Tribute Museum, formerly known as the 9/11 Tribute Center and Tribute WTC, shared the personal stories of family members who lost loved ones, survivors, rescue and recovery workers, volunteers and Lower Manhattan residents with those who want to learn about the September 11 attacks. It was located in the Financial District section of Manhattan in New York City, and offered walking tours and galleries with 9/11 artifacts and history before it transitioned to a solely online museum in August 2022.



Organization
The 9/11 Tribute Museum is a 501(c)3 non-profit, and is a project of the September ' Association. While the larger National September 11 Memorial & Museum focuses on those who died, Tribute has maintained their focus on the survivors.

The 9/11 Tribute Museum provides educational experiences for visitors and a central place for the local community and victims' families and friends to gather and share their personal experiences with the public.

The museum did not have an endowment and focused on admissions income for its operations.

History
The 9/11 Tribute Museum, formerly known as the 9/11 Tribute Center and Tribute WTC Visitor Center, is a project of the September ’ Association. The September ’ Association was created by widows and other family members of those killed in the 9/11 attacks. The Association established a mission to unite and support all victims of terrorism through communication, representation and peer support.

The 9/11 Tribute Center opened on September 6, 2006, across the street from the World Trade Center site and next to the Engine 10/Ladder 10 Firehouse of the New York City Fire Department. It was located in the former Liberty Deli, where meals and supplies were given to rescue workers in the attacks' aftermath. The Association renovated the space to create an educational center with photos, artifacts, and stories shared by the community. In June 2017, the Museum moved to 92 Greenwich Street, a location that provided it with more exhibit space.

Although the 9/11 Tribute Center opened first, it has remained the smaller of the city's two museums dedicated to 9/11. The museum's landlord Thor Equities placed 92 Greenwich Street for sale in November 2019, which would have forced the museum to relocate or close. The impact of the COVID-19 pandemic on tourism ultimately led the museum to announce in March 2022 that it would close. The museum shuttered its physical location on August 17, 2022, and moved all of its exhibits online. The museum's physical location had attracted five million visitors and given 500,000 guided tours throughout its existence.

Tours

The 9/11 Tribute Museum has trained volunteer guides who all have personal 9/11 experiences. The museum had 900 trained tour guides, some of whom came from as far away as Northern Virginia. Tours took visitors on a walk through the 9/11 Memorial Plaza, with stops at other significant locations such as the Firefighters' Memorial Wall and the Survivor Tree. These tours ceased when the museum closed its physical location on August 17, 2022.

See also
 Construction of the World Trade Center
 World Trade Center (1973–2001)
 Memorials and services for the September 11 attacks

References

External links
 , 9/11 Tribute Museum
 , September  Association

2006 establishments in New York City
Buildings and structures completed in 2006
History museums in New York City
Memorials for the September 11 attacks
Monuments and memorials in Manhattan
Museums in Manhattan
Public benefit corporations in New York (state)
World Trade Center